Abbas Ibrahim Zada is a politician from Afghanistan. He is the former representative of the people of Balkh during the 16th parliamentary term of Afghanistan Parliament.

Early life 
Abbas Ibrahim Zada was born in 1970 in Sholgara district of Balkh province. He graduated from the Bakhtar High School in Mazar-e Sharif with a 12th-grade degree.

See also 
 List of Hazara people

References 

Living people
1970 births
Hazara politicians
Members of the House of the People (Afghanistan)
People from Balkh Province